Kentucky Route 717 (KY 717) is a  state highway in northeastern Boone County and northwestern Kenton County, Kentucky, that runs from KY 842 and the southbound lanes of Interstate 71 (I-71) and I-75 in northwestern Florence to KY 3076 and Turfway Road in northwestern Erlanger.

Major intersections

References

0717
0717
0717